Eleanor Audrey Summerfield (7 March 1921 – 13 July 2001) was an English actress who appeared in many plays, films and television series. She is known for her roles in Laughter in Paradise (1951), Final Appointment (1954), Odongo (1956), Dentist in the Chair (1960), On the Fiddle (1961), The Running Man (1963) and Some Will, Some Won't (1970).

Early life and career
She was born as Eleanor Audrey Summerfield in St Pancras, London on 7 March 1921. Summerfield trained at the Royal Academy of Dramatic Art in 1937.

She made her screen debut in the 1946 television drama A Phoenix Too Frequent, which was based on a play of the same name. Her first stage show was Her Excellency at the London Hippodrome in 1949. In the mid-1960s, Summerfield played P.G. Wodehouse's fictional character Aunt Dahlia on the black-and-white television series The World of Wooster (1965–1967) aired on BBC 1. Summerfield was also a regular member in the panel game Just a Minute and was a team member for the entire 15-year run of Many a Slip (1964–1979). During her career spanning nearly half a century, she also appeared in a number of films and television series. Other TV series she appeared in included Lovejoy: Season 2: Episode 5, 1991 Who Dares, Sings as May Walker; and Midsomer Murders: Series 1: Episode 4, 1998 Faithful Until Death as Elfrida Molfrey.

Personal life and death
Summerfield was married to actor Leonard Sachs from 1947 until his death in 1990. They had two sons: Robin Sachs, who was also an actor, and Toby Sachs.

She died in Westminster, London on 13 July 2001, aged 80.

Filmography

 Take My Life (1947) - Miss Carteret
 London Belongs to Me (1948) - The Blonde
 The Weaker Sex (1948) - Clippie (uncredited)
 The Story of Shirley Yorke (1948) - Doris
 All Over the Town (1949) - Beryl Hopper
 Man on the Run (1949) - May Baker, Anchor Hotel
 No Way Back (1949) - Beryl
 The Third Visitor (1951) - Vera Kurton
 Laughter in Paradise (1951) - Sheila Wilcott
 Scrooge (1951) - Miss Flora
 The Last Page (1952) - Vi
 Mandy (1952) - Lily Tabor
 Top Secret (1952) - Cecilia
 Street Corner (1953) - Edna Hurran
 Isn't Life Wonderful! (1953) - Aunt Kate
 Face the Music (1954) - Barbara Quigley
 Murder by Proxy (aka Blackout) (1954) - Margaret 'Maggie' Doone
 Final Appointment (1954) - Jenny
 Lost (1956) - Sgt. Cook
 Odongo (1956) - Celia Watford
 It's Great to Be Young (1956) - Barmaid
 No Road Back (1957) - Marguerite
 A Cry from the Streets (1958) - Gloria
 Dentist in the Chair (1960) - Ethel
 The Millionairess (1960) - Mrs. Willoughby
 Carry On Regardless (1961) - Mrs. Riley (part cut) (uncredited)
 Spare the Rod (1961) - Mrs. Harkness
 Don't Bother to Knock (1961) - Mother
 On the Fiddle (1961) - Flora McNaughton
 Petticoat Pirates (1961) - Chief Wren Mabel Rawlins
 Guns of Darkness (1962) - Mrs. Bastian
 On the Beat (1962) - Sgt. Lucilla Wilkins
 The Running Man (1963) - Hilda Tanner
 The Yellow Hat (1966) - Lady Xenia
 The Spy Killer (1969, TV Movie) - Mrs. Roberts
 Foreign Exchange (1970, TV Movie) - Mrs. Roberts
 Some Will, Some Won't (1970) - Elizabeth Robson
 The Watcher in the Woods (1981) - Mrs. Thayer
 The Island of Adventure (1982) - Aunt Polly

References

External links
 
 Obituary in The Guardian
 Obituary in The Daily Telegraph

1921 births
2001 deaths
Actresses from London
English film actresses
English stage actresses
English television actresses
20th-century English actresses
Alumni of RADA